Orophia melicoma is a species of moth in the family Depressariidae. It was described by Edward Meyrick in 1931, and is known from Sierra Leone.

References

Moths described in 1931
Orophia
Moths of Africa